Datavail is a database, application, and analytics service provider based in Broomfield, Colorado. The company provides services for DB2, Oracle, SQL, and MySQL databases. According to Inc., the company is the largest provider of remote database administration services in North America. Scott Frock serves as the company's CEO. Datavail has offices in India, Sri Lanka, and Canada.

History
Datavail was founded as a spin-off from Stratavia in 2008. In November, Datavail moved its headquarters from downtown Denver, Colorado to Broomfield, Colorado. The company managed 7,000 databases for 47 corporate clients that year. In November 2010, Datavail appointed Mark Perlstein as CEO. In 2022, former COO, Scott Frock, was promoted to CEO of the company.

Acquisitions 
The company acquired Blue Gecko, a Seattle-based managed service provider, in July 2012. Blue Gecko began operating as a subsidiary of Datavail after the acquisition.

In November 2021, the company acquired Skybridge Global. In January 2017, Datavail acquired Navantis, a Toronto-based company that specializes in Microsoft applications. In March, Datavail acquired Advanced EPM Consulting, Inc., an information technology company. Later that year, in July 2017, Datavail announced the acquisition of Accelatis, an enterprise performance management software platform company.

References

External links
 

American companies established in 2008
Companies based in Broomfield, Colorado
Database companies
Information technology companies of the United States
Technology companies established in 2008